How Doctors Think is a book released in March 2007 by Jerome Groopman, the Dina and Raphael Recanati Chair of Medicine at Harvard Medical School, chief of experimental medicine at Beth Israel Deaconess Medical Center in Boston, and staff writer for The New Yorker magazine.

The book opens with a discussion of a woman in her thirties who suffered daily stomach cramps and serious weight loss, and who visited some 30 doctors over a period of 15 years.  Several misdiagnoses were made before she was finally found to have celiac disease. Groopman explains that no one can expect a physician to be infallible, as medicine is an uncertain science, and every doctor sometimes makes mistakes in diagnosis and treatment.  But the frequency and seriousness of those mistakes can be reduced by "understanding how a doctor thinks and how he or she can think better".

The book includes Groopman's own experiences both as an oncologist and as a patient, as well as interviews by Groopman of prominent physicians in the medical community. Notably, he describes his difficulties with a number of orthopedic surgeons as he sought treatment for a debilitating ligament laxity he developed in his right hand, which over several years had led to the formation of cysts in the bones of his wrist.

Salem's challenge
Groopman spends a great deal of the book discussing the challenge posed to him by Dr. Deeb Salem, chairman of the Department of Internal Medicine at Tufts-New England Medical Center, during a presentation the author made at their hospital grand rounds. During the presentation, Groopman was discussing the importance of compassion and communication in providing medical care when Salem posed the following question:

At the time of the presentation, Groopman was unable to provide a satisfactory response. Salem's question reminded Groopman of his experiences with physicians at the Phillips House of the world-renowned Massachusetts General Hospital, where he trained as a resident in the 1970s. Per his account:

The availability heuristic
Early in the work, Groopman discusses the work of Amos Tversky and Nobel laureate Daniel Kahneman, psychologists from Hebrew University in Jerusalem. Specifically, he explores their development in the early 1980s of a concept known as the availability heuristic.

In the theory, "availability" is defined as the tendency to judge the likelihood of explanation for an event by the ease with which relevant examples come to mind. In a clinical situation a diagnosis may be made because the physician often sees similar cases in their practice — for example, the misclassification of aspirin toxicity as a viral pneumonia, or the improper recognition of an essential tremor as delirium tremens due to alcohol withdrawal in an indigent urban setting. Groopman argues that clinicians will misattribute a general symptom as specific to a certain disease based on the frequency they encounter that disease in their practice.

Kahneman won the Nobel Prize in economics in 2002 for his work on heuristics, an honor that Groopman believes Tversky would have shared had he not died in 1996.

Lack of recognition for gatekeepers
Groopman also serves as an advocate for primary care physicians in his book. He argues that gatekeeper physicians are underreimbursed for their work, believing this to be a legacy of the period earlier this century when surgeons headed the medical societies that negotiated with insurers about what a 'customary' payment for services was to be.

He suggests that the poor reimbursement and lack of recognition for primary care physicians is fundamentally flawed. He quotes Dr. Eric J. Cassell's book, Doctoring: The Nature of Primary Care Medicine, to defend his assertion:

The fallacy of logic
In a later chapter Groopman reports a frank discussion with Dr. James E. Lock, chief of cardiology at Boston Children's Hospital. During their conversation, Groopman asks the world-renowned cardiologist about the times in his career when he made mistakes in patient treatment.

To the query, Lock gives the cryptic response, "All my mistakes have the same things in common."

Lock then elaborates, discussing recommendations he made to repair specific heart defects in neonates that ultimately led to worse clinical outcomes and potentially avoidable deaths. The recommendations he made were based on a purely logical understanding of cardiac physiology. The crucial point of Lock's discussion came with his confession:

Groopman goes on to write, "Lock averted his gaze and his face fell; to be wrong about a child is a form of suffering unique to his profession [as a pediatrician]."

Disregard of uncertainty
Groopman also discusses the work of Renee Fox, a physician and occupational sociologist who observed residents and attendings in a hospital ward setting, noting their various ways of coping with the uncertainties of medical treatment. The mechanisms to cope that Fox observed included, for example, black humor, making bets about who would be right about a patient's prognosis, and engaging in magical thinking to maintain a sense of poise and competence in front of patients while performing circumspect procedures.

Jay Katz, a clinical instructor at Yale Law School has since termed these coping mechanisms under the rubric 'disregard of uncertainty', which he believes physicians develop to deal with the anxiety of shifting from the certainty of theoretical discussions of medicine early in their training to its more happenstance practical application.

Groopman recalls that in situations where he had been hesitant to take clinical action based on incomplete data, it had been wisest at times to follow the advice of his mentor Dr. Linda A. Lewis: "Don't just do something, stand there." Groopman asserts that there exist situations in which inaction may be the wisest course of action.

Suggestions for patients 

Groopman closes with an epilogue giving advice for patients. He gives the following tools that patients can use to help reduce or rectify cognitive errors:

 Ask What else could it be?, combating satisfaction of search bias and leading the doctor to consider a broader range of possibilities.
 Ask Is there anything that doesn't fit?, combatting confirmation bias and again leading the doctor to think broadly.
 Ask Is it possible I have more than one problem?, because multiple simultaneous disorders do exist and frequently cause confusing symptoms.
 Tell what you are most worried about, opening discussion and leading either to reassurance (if the worry is unlikely) or careful analysis (if the worry is plausible).
 Retell the story from the beginning. Details that were omitted in the initial telling may be recalled, or different wording or the different context may make clues more salient. (This is most appropriate when the condition has not responded to treatment or there is other reason to believe that a misdiagnosis is possible.)

See also
Availability heuristic
Diagnosis
Medical ethics
The Deadly Dinner Party
Fatal Care: Survive in the U.S. Health System
To Err is Human

References

2007 non-fiction books
Medical books
Nosology
Houghton Mifflin books
Psychology books